The Music Victoria Awards of 2019 are the 14th Annual Music Victoria Awards and consist of a series of awards, presented on 22 November 2019, during Melbourne Music Week. The Award for The Best Global Act changed its name to Best Intercultural Act.

Hall of Fame inductees
 PBS 106.7FM, Vika & Linda Bull

Now entering its 40th year, PBS (Progressive Broadcasting Service) was conceived in 1979 as a community, member-based radio station unimpeded by commercial interests and dedicated to sharing and promoting diverse music not heard on other stations.

Vika and Linda Bull have forged diverse pathways into soul, gospel, blues, country and the island music of their Tongan ancestry. They have spawned eight albums of their own, as well as illuminating studio and concert performances by Paul Kelly, Rockwiz, C.W. Stoneking, Deborah Conway, Kasey Chambers and many more. They were inducted by Kate Ceberano.

Outstanding Achievement award
 Tones and I

Award nominees and winners

General awards
Voted on by the public.
Winners indicated in boldface, with other nominees in plain.

Genre Specific Awards
Voted by a select industry panel

Other Awards
Voted by a select industry panel

References

External links
 

2019 in Australian music
2019 music awards
Music Victoria Awards